Frederick William Pomeroy  (9 October 1856 – 26 May 1924) was a prolific British sculptor of architectural and monumental works. He became a leading sculptor in the New Sculpture movement, a group distinguished by a stylistic turn towards naturalism and for their works of architectural sculpture.  Pomeroy had several significant public works in London and elsewhere in the United Kingdom, notably in Belfast. His work in London includes the figure of Lady Justice (1905–1906) on the dome of the Old Bailey.

Biography
Pomeroy was born in London, the son of an artist-craftsman. After his father died in 1869 Pomeroy, aged 14, was left as the main wage-earner for the family and was apprenticed to a firm of architectural stone carvers. Later he trained, for four years, with William Silver Frith at the South London Technical School of Art where he was also taught by Jules Dalou. The naturalistic style of Dalou's sculptures were a great influence on Pomeroy's subsequent works. In 1880, Pomeroy was able to enrol in the Royal Academy Schools, where he won a number of prizes, including silver medals in both 1882 and 1883. In 1885 he won a gold medal and travelling scholarship which allowed him to study in Paris under Antonin Mercié and also in Italy.

On returning to London, Pomeroy joined the Art Workers Guild in 1887, and in 1888 began exhibiting with the Arts and Crafts Exhibition Society. For the fountain, now situated on Glasgow Green, Pomeroy carved the group representing Australia. Also in 1887 he met the architect J. D. Sedding who subsequently commissioned a large number of decorative architectural works from Pomeroy. These included carvings for the Church of Our Most Holy Redeemer in London, an exterior sculpture for the tower of St Clement's Church in Bournemouth plus a screen and choir stalls in bronze for Holy Trinity, Sloane Street. Pomeroy also created a bronze angel, now lost, for St Peter's Church, Ealing to accompany decorative work by Henry Wilson.

Alongside his architectural work, Pomeroy continued to create smaller exhibition pieces. He carved a marble replica of Frederic Leighton's 1877 bronze sculpture Athlete wrestling with a python which was exhibited at the Royal Academy in 1891 before being transported to Denmark and, eventually, to Australia. The piece was poorly received at the Academy in comparison to the bronze original but a number of other works in the New Sculpture style by Pomeroy helped build his artistic reputation. These included his 1890 statuette of Dionysus, now in the Tate, So on a Delphic Reed from 1888 and Love the Conqueror shown at both the Royal Academy and the Walker Art Gallery in Liverpool during 1893. During the 1890s, Pomeroy showed eleven works at the Royal Academy, eight of which were small statuettes. Some of these, including Perseus and Love the Conqueror were reproduced in sizes suitable for the domestic market, although some much larger versions of Perseus were also cast.

After Sedding died in 1891, his pupil Henry Wilson took over his architectural practice and continued to commission designs from Pomeroy. These included a chimney piece, now destroyed, for a library at Ladbroke Grove in London, decorative items for the library and chapel at Welbeck Abbey in Nottinghamshire and a frieze for the chapel at Douglas Castle in South Lanarkshire. The architect Edward William Mountford commissioned architectural sculptures and decorations from Pomeroy for Paisley Town Hall in 1890 and, more extensively, for Sheffield Town Hall in 1895. For the latter Pomeroy created a number of works, including a frieze of industrial workers, low-reliefs of figures representing Steam and Electricity, figures of Thor and Vulcan supporting the city crest plus a series of six lunettes and spandrels representing aspects of civic virtue. 

In the first decade of the 20th century, Pomeroy received several further commissions for architectural sculptures on buildings designed by Mountford. These included the figure of Lady Justice on the dome of the Old Bailey plus figures for the entrance to the court, statuettes, lamp standards and other decorations for the Liverpool Museum and Technical College, work for Lancaster Town Hall and a series of low-relief panels on gin-making for the exterior of Booth's Distillery in central London. Starting in 1905 Pomeroy created four colossal bronze figures for the upstream side of Vauxhall Bridge in London.

In 1907 Pomeroy became Master of the Art Workers Guild. He was elected an Associate member of the Royal Academy in 1906, and a full member in 1917. From 1898 to 1908 he was a regular exhibitor with the International Society of Sculptors, Painters and Gravers, at Leeds City Art Gallery from 1897 to 1909, with the Aberdeen Artists Society from 1893 to 1923 and with the Royal Scottish Academy he showed seven works between 1903 and 1924. Pomeroy displayed works at the Royal Academy Summer Exhibition each year from 1885 to 1924 and, in the same period, showed 17 works at the Royal Glasgow Institute of the Fine Arts and, late in his life, became a regular exhibitor with the Royal West of England Academy. Several museums hold examples of Pomeroy's work including the Tate, the Victoria and Albert Museum, the Ashmolean Museum in Oxford, the Laing Art Gallery in Newcastle upon Tyne and Pollok House in Glasgow.

In 1913 Pomeroy married Patricia Morrison Coughlan, of Douglas, County Cork, with who he had two sons. Pomeroy died on 26 May 1924, aged 65, and was buried at Boscombe in Hampshire. A memorial to him is in St James's Church, Piccadilly.

Public works

1887–1905

1906–1909

1910–1919

1920–1924

Other works
 Marble reredos at St Saviour's Church, Colgate, West Sussex
 A marble bust of William Henry Perkin for the Royal Society of Chemistry at Burlington House, London.
 A bust of the surgeon Sir Henry Thompson at Golders Green in London.
 Chancel stalls and screen at Holy Trinity, Sloane Street, London.

References

External links

1856 births
1924 deaths
19th-century English sculptors
20th-century English sculptors
19th-century English male artists
20th-century English male artists
Alumni of the City and Guilds of London Art School
Alumni of the Royal Academy Schools
British architectural sculptors
English male sculptors
Masters of the Art Worker's Guild
People from Lambeth
Royal Academicians
Sculptors from London